This list of Vogue China cover models is a catalog of cover models who have appeared on the cover of Vogue China, the Chinese edition of Vogue magazine, starting with the magazine's first issue in September 2005.

2000s

2005

2006

2007

2008

2009

2010s

2010

2011

2012

2013

2014

2015

2016

2017

2018

2019

2020s

2020

2021

2022

2023

External links 
 Vogue China Official Site

China
Vogue
Chinese fashion